Con brio is a novel by Slovenian author Brina Švigelj-Mérat. It was first published in 1998.

See also
List of Slovenian novels

Slovenian novels
Slovenian romance novels
1998 novels